Doña María Josefa Alonso-Pimentel y Téllez-Girón iure uxoris Duchess of Osuna, suo jure 12th Duchess of Benavente (26 November 1752 – 5 October 1834), was a Spanish Salonnière, famous as a patron of artists, writers and scientists and an important figure of the Spanish Age of Enlightenment. She was the first female (honorary) member of the royal Sociedad Económica de Amigos del País de Madrid as well as the first president of the royal Junta de Damas de Honor y Mérito.

Biography

She married Pedro Téllez-Girón, 9th Duke of Osuna in 1771. The couple had many children; her possessions and noble titles were absorbed thereto by the Osuna family.

She was a noted figure of the Spanish Enlightenment. Soon after her marriage, she established a famous literary salon in her Palace near the royal palace in Madrid, which became a center of the French influenced Enlightenment in Spain, were science, culture, literature and art was discussed between aristocrats, foreign diplomats and artists.  She played an important role in the ongoing social change in 18th-century Spain, in which women participated more fully in society and played a more active social role.  

In 1787, she became the first President of the Junta de Damas de Honor y Mérito. It was a substantial pioneer role, since learned societies and academies was an important part of the Age of Enlightenment, but women's inclusion in them had been posed until the establishment of the Junta de Damas.  She used her chairmanship to engage the society in work such as the education of poor girls and the rehabilitation of women criminals.  

When the French invaded Spain in 1808, she fled from Madrid via Seville to Cadiz, where she lived until the French left Spain in 1814.   

The Duchess and her husband were among the most important aristocrats who became patrons of the painter Francisco de Goya. The Duchess not only purchased one of the first editions of Los Caprichos, but also commissioned a series of cabinet paintings on the subject of witchcraft from Goya, amongst them El aquelarre (Witches' Sabbath). In the famous portrait Goya painted of her, she is shown standing with noble reserve, and dressed according to the fashion initiated by Queen Marie Antoinette in Paris at that time. In another famous painting, Goya portrayed the ducal family. One of her children was Joaquina Téllez-Girón, Marchioness of Santa Cruz, who was also portrayed by Goya.

The Duchess was interested in landscape gardening and from the 1780s she developed a garden at El Capricho, the family estate at Alameda de Osuna, near Madrid.  The garden, which survives in good condition, shows English and French influence.

Full name and title

In full, her Spanish name and titles were: Doña María Josefa de la Soledad Alonso Pimentel Téllez-Girón Borja y Centelles, décimo quinta condesa y décimo segunda duquesa de Benavente, décimo tercera duquesa de Béjar, décimo tercera duquesa de Plasencia, décimo segunda duquesa de Arcos, décimo cuarta duquesa de Gandia, novena duquesa de Mandas y Villanueva, octava marquesa de Jabalquinto, décimo quinta marquesa de Gibraleón, novena marquesa de Terranova, décimo segunda marquesa de Lombay, décimo sexta marquesa de Zahara, décimo octava condesa de Mayorga, décimo sexta condesa de Luna, décimo tercera condesa de Bañares, séptima condesa de Belalcázar, décimo cuarta condesa de Oliva, décimo primera condesa de Mayalde, décimo segunda condesa de Bailén, décimo segunda condesa de Casares, décimo quinta vizcondesa de la Puebla de Alcocer, 6 veces Grande de España, principessa di Anglona, duchessa di Monteagudo, marchesa di Marguini, contessa di Osilò e di Coguinas en Cerdeña, dama de la Orden de María Luisa.

Ancestry

Additional information

Images by Francisco Goya

Paintings by Francisco Goya for the Duke and Duchess

References

1752 births
1834 deaths
Dukes of Benavente
Maria Josefa
Dukes of Arcos
Dukes of Plasencia
Téllez-Girón family
Spanish salon-holders
Spanish duchesses
Spanish art collectors
Nobility from Madrid
Grandees of Spain